"I Have a Special Plan for This World" is a longform single by the English band Current 93.  The lyrics are taken from a poem of the same name by the author Thomas Ligotti and spoken by David Tibet. Additional sound treatments are credited to Current 93. The single was released on limited edition vinyl and CD in 2000 on David Tibet's Durtro label. There was an additional special release in February 2007, when three test pressings were made in black vinyl. These featured signed and personalized sleeves with gold ink drawing and hand written labels done in black ink.

Musically, I Have a Special Plan for This World was a temporary return of sorts by Current 93 to their experimental post-industrial roots, using various unconventional musical instruments and techniques (synthesised drones, found sound, a circuit-bent Speak & Spell) while dispensing almost entirely with the minimal acoustic guitar and piano melodies that characterised the group's sound at that point. There was, however, some continuity musically as the single expanded upon both the nihilistic themes and experimental sonic motifs that appeared in the Inmost Light trilogy of albums from five years prior.

Track listing

12" version
Side A
 "I Have a Special Plan for This World" - 22:00
Side B
 "Excerpts from Bungalow Tapes" - 18:40

CD version
 "I Have a Special Plan for This World" – 22:01

References

2000 singles
2000 songs
Current 93 songs